Juan de Sanct Martín, also known as Juan de San Martín, was a Spanish conquistador. Little is known about De Sanct Martín, apart from a passage in El Carnero (1638) by Juan Rodríguez Freyle and Epítome de la conquista del Nuevo Reino de Granada, a work of uncertain authorship. He took part in the expedition from Santa Marta into the Eastern Ranges of the Colombian Andes led by Gonzalo Jiménez de Quesada and founded Cuítiva, Boyacá in 1550. Juan de Sanct Martín headed the left flank of the Spanish troops in the Battle of Tocarema against the Panche on August 20, 1538, while his fellow conquistador Juan de Céspedes commanded the right flank. In this battle, Juan de Sanct Martín killed the cacique of the Panche and was hurt himself. Juan de Sanct Martín had confronted the Panche the year before, when he was sent to the west while De Céspedes went south. Due to the resistance of the bellicose Panche, De Sanct Martín returned to the Spanish camp.

Conquest by Juan de Sanct Martín

See also 

List of conquistadors in Colombia
Spanish conquest of the Muisca
El Dorado
Hernán Pérez de Quesada
Gonzalo Jiménez de Quesada

References

Bibliography

Further reading 
 
 
 
 
 
 
 

Year of birth unknown
Year of death unknown
16th-century Spanish people
16th-century explorers
Spanish conquistadors
Spanish city founders
History of the Muisca
History of Colombia